The Battle of Slunj was fought on 26 October 1584 between the Ottoman forces of the Bosnian Beglerbeg, Ferhad Pasha Sokolović, and Germanic and Croatian forces led by Jobst Joseph von Thurn and Tamás Erdődy, the Ban of Croatia, that ambushed the Ottoman Army stationed near the town of Slunj. The battle was a part of the Croatian–Ottoman wars and Ottoman–Habsburg wars between the Ottoman Empire and the Habsburg monarchy. Ottoman troops were estimated at between 8-10,000 men, and the army of Thurn and Erdödy consisted of 1,330 cavalry and 700 infantry. The battle resulted in a crushing defeat for the Ottoman forces.

Bibliography

Vojna enciklopedija (1970–76), 10 svezaka plus indeks, Vojno izdavački zavod Beograd, knjiga 8, str 719, članak Slunj (Srpsko hrvatski jezik)

References

External links

 Battle of Slunj - first victory of young Toma Erdödy, Ban of Croatia
 Ottomans reached Slunj in 1584

Battles involving Habsburg Croatia
Battles involving the Ottoman Empire
1584 in military history
16th century military history of Croatia
Modruš-Rijeka County
Slunj
1584 in Europe
History of Kordun